Perrhaebia was the northernmost district of ancient Thessaly, where the tribe of the Perrhaebi lived. Major cities were: Pythion, Doliche, Azorus, Oloosson and Phalanna the capital. Perrhaebia was part of Macedonia between the 4th and 1st centuries BC.

References
In the shadow of Olympus By Eugene N. Borza Page 164 

 
Historical regions in Greece
Ancient Macedonia